Freier Fall (English: Free Fall) is the debut studio album by Austrian recording artist Christina Stürmer. Recorded after her participation in the ORF 1 talent show Starmania, where she had finished runner-up, it was released by Amadeo, a Universal Music subsidiary, on 16 June 2003 in Austria. Upon its release, it became one of the most successful debuts in years, reaching number-one on the Austrian Albums Chart and finishing second on the Ö3 Austria year-end chart. It was eventually certified  4× Platinum by the International Federation of the Phonographic Industry (IFPI), indicating sales in excess of 120,000 copies.

Track listing

Charts

Weekly charts

Year-end charts

Certifications

References

External links 
 

Christina Stürmer albums
2003 debut albums
German-language albums